Eugnamptus punctatus is a species of leaf rolling weevil in the beetle family Attelabidae. It is found in North America.

Subspecies
These two subspecies belong to the species Eugnamptus punctatus:
 Eugnamptus punctatus niger Pierce
 Eugnamptus punctatus punctatus

References

Further reading

 
 

Attelabidae
Articles created by Qbugbot
Beetles described in 1913